Jason Sherman (born July 28, 1962 in Montreal, Quebec) is a Canadian playwright and screenwriter.

After graduating from the creative writing program at York University in 1985, Sherman co-founded What Publishing with Kevin Connolly, which produced what, a literary magazine that he edited from 1985 to 1990. Before establishing himself as a dramatist, Sherman's journalistic works such as reviews, essays, and interviews appeared in various publications, including The Globe and Mail, Canadian Theatre Review and Theatrum.

He edited two anthologies for Coach House Press, Canadian Brash (1991) and Solo (1993), and was playwright-in-residence at Tarragon Theatre from 1992 to 1999.

Sherman's first professional productions were A Place Like Pamela (1991) and To Cry is Not So (1991), followed by The League of Nathans (1992, published in book form in 1996), which won a Floyd S. Chalmers Canadian Play Award (1993), and was nominated for the Governor General's Award for English language drama. Among his many other plays is Three in the Back, Two in the Head, which won the Governor General's Literary Award for Drama (1995), and Reading Hebron, which had its most recent production at London's Orange Tree Theatre in March 2011.

In the November 2007 issue of This Magazine, Sherman wrote an article explaining why he would no longer be writing stage plays. Since then, he has written extensively for television and radio, including the CBC Radio series Afghanada and the television series Bloodletting & Miraculous Cures and The Best Laid Plans.

In 2021 he released My Tree, a documentary film about his trip to Israel to locate a tree that was planted in his name decades earlier. The film premiered at the 2021 Hot Docs Canadian International Documentary Festival, and received a Canadian Screen Award nomination for Best Feature Length Documentary at the 10th Canadian Screen Awards in 2022.

Works

 A Place Like Pamela (1991)
 To Cry is Not So (1991)
 The League of Nathans (1992)
 What the Russians Say (1993)
 Field (1993)
 The Merchant of Showboat (1993)
 Three in the Back, Two in the Head (1994)
 Reading Hebron (1995)
 The Retreat (1996)
 None is Too Many (1997)
 Patience (1998)
 It's All True (1999)
 An Acre of Time (1999/2000)
 Afghanada (2006–11)
 Bloodletting & Miraculous Cures (2010)
 We Were Children (2012); screenplay
 La Ronde (2013) Soulpepper, adaptation by Jason Sherman
Copy That (2019); commissioned for Tarragon Theatre

References

External links
 Jason Sherman

1962 births
20th-century Canadian dramatists and playwrights
21st-century Canadian dramatists and playwrights
Canadian male screenwriters
Jewish Canadian writers
Living people
Governor General's Award-winning dramatists
Canadian television writers
Canadian radio writers
Canadian male dramatists and playwrights
Writers from Montreal
20th-century Canadian male writers
Canadian male television writers
21st-century Canadian screenwriters
21st-century Canadian male writers